The National Board of Boiler and Pressure Vessel Inspectors (NBBI) is composed of chief boiler and pressure vessel inspectors representing states, cities, and provinces enforcing pressure equipment laws and regulations. Created to prevent death, injury and destruction, these laws and regulations represent the collective input of National Board members.

During the past ten years, over six million pressure equipment inspections were performed in North America. Of that total, there were more than 556,000 violations, or more than 556,000 potential accidents that were prevented: almost one out of every ten pieces of equipment inspected. For the general public, the importance of thoroughly trained and specially commissioned inspectors is of critical significance: every person in the civilized world comes within close proximity of pressure equipment several times each day.

A Short History 
Steam drove the Industrial Revolution during the mid-19th century. At this point in history, conversion of water was considered both good and bad: good in the sense it powered industrial progress, and bad in that boilers used in the conversion process employed new and unproven technology. According to the  American Society of Mechanical Engineers (ASME):

“For want of reliably tested materials, secure fittings and proper valves, boilers of every description, on land and at sea, were exploding with terrifying frequency…Engineers could take pride in the growing superiority of American technology but they could not ignore the price of 50,000 dead and two million injured by accidents annually.”

As catastrophic casualties continued into the early 20th century, the ASME developed its boiler code in 1915. While the code provided a solid reference of construction standards, it lacked an important component: the authority to regulate. This was complicated by existence of local and state jurisdictions having their own codes and standards. The result was a patchwork of confusion having no basis in consistency.

On December 2, 1919, Ohio Chief Inspector Carl Myers met with chief inspectors from other jurisdictions to discuss creation of a board of inspector representatives from each of the existing jurisdictions. Hence, the genesis of The National Board of Boiler and Pressure Vessel Inspectors.

Pressure Equipment Dangers 
Over the years, as safety standards developed, there are no longer 50,000 deaths caused by pressure equipment each year. However, if not properly maintained and inspected, boilers and pressure vessels can be lethal, and in some instances, catastrophic. 

For example, rupture of a typical  home hot-water tank generates the equivalent of 0.16 pounds of nitroglycerin. Translated, that is enough force to send the average car (weighing 2,500 pounds) to a height of nearly  – or more than the elevation of a 14-story apartment building starting with a lift-off velocity of 85 miles per hour. When a similar hot-water tank explodes, its volume expands approximately 1,600 times. That is comparable to taking a  trash can and causing it to fill a 12’ x 11’ living room with an  ceiling in a split second. A large industrial boiler has the capacity to level an entire city block.

National Board Training 
Every year the National Board hosts hundreds of boiler and pressure equipment professionals from around the world. National Board training facilities are located on a  wooded campus in Columbus, Ohio. Attendees are taught by professionals actively involved with codes and standards development. Class sizes are limited for more interaction and individualized attention. The very latest equipment and instructional aides are employed along with the opportunity to acquire hands-on experience. National Board training reflects credibility and reputation as a third party evolving from the regulation and enforcement side of the boiler and pressure vessel industry.

National Board Registration 
Registering a pressure-retaining item with the National Board requires certain uniform quality standards be achieved certifying the manufacturing, testing, and inspection process. This certification acknowledges to owners, users, and public safety jurisdictional authorities registered items have been inspected by National Board-commissioned inspectors and built to required standards. The purpose of National Board registration is to promote safety and document specific equipment design and construction details for future use. It takes place when the manufacturer submits data reports to the National Board for items stamped with National Board numbers. 

A data report is similar to a birth certificate. Among the information included are: date of manufacture, materials of construction, specific details regarding design, and certification statements by both the manufacturer and inspector. Registration is required by most US jurisdictions for installation of pressure equipment. Registered pressure relief devices are stamped with a National Board NB Mark. For the manufacturer, data reports provide an essential form of customer service over the life of the equipment – a value-added quality of significant worth to the owner or user. Since the process began in 1921, there have been over 45 million data reports registered with the National Board.

National Board Pressure Relief Department and Testing Laboratory 

Each year, representatives from around the world travel to the National Board Testing Laboratory north of Columbus, Ohio to measure the performance of their company’s pressure relieving devices. 

Tested products undergo independent certification of function and capacity. A pressure relief device meeting new construction standards and specifications permits the manufacturer to apply the National Board NB mark to new equipment. Capacity certification signifies equipment designs have been thoroughly reviewed. Additionally, it indicates the quality system has been audited and the equipment meets internationally recognized standards for preventing potential overpressure conditions in boilers and pressure vessels.

Testing is also performed to evaluate a company’s ability to properly repair pressure relief valves. Accredited repair organizations qualify to stamp the National Board VR symbol on repair nameplates.

The National Board lab supports industry research and development by testing new designs, serving as a comparative standard for other laboratories, validating new concepts, and – upon jurisdiction request – assist in boiler and pressure vessel incident investigations.

National Board Accreditation 
Repairs and alterations are essential in maintaining pressure equipment integrity. These can vary from simple welded repairs to the repair of safety relief valves. The National Board administers three accreditation programs for organizations performing repairs and alterations. Accreditation involves a thorough evaluation of the organization’s quality system manual including a demonstration of its ability to implement the system. Authorized repair organizations are issued symbol stamps for application to equipment nameplates signifying the integrity of work performed. 

The R Certificate of Authorization is issued to an accredited organization performing repairs and alterations to pressure-retaining items. The VR Certificate of Authorization is provided for repairs and modification to pressure relief device (R and VR stamps are required in a number of U.S. jurisdictions.) The NR Certificate of Authorization is issued for repairs and replacement of nuclear components. All National Board code symbol stamps are registered trademarks of The National Board of Boiler and Pressure Vessel Inspectors.

National Board Inspection Code 
As the flagship publication of the National Board, the National Board Inspection Code (NBIC) is a consensus document created by an evolving committee of pressure equipment professionals. Distributed biennially, the NBIC provides rules, information, and guidance to manufacturers, jurisdictions, inspectors, repair organizations, owner-users, installers, contractors, as well as other individuals and organizations performing or involved in post-construction activities. The objective is to provide uniform administration of rules pertaining to pressure equipment items.

The NBIC was first published in 1945 and is today the only standard recognized worldwide for inservice repair and alteration of boilers and pressure vessels. Approved as an American National Standard (ANSI) in August 1987, the National Board Inspection Code has been adopted by a number of states and jurisdictions, as well as federal regulatory agencies, including the United States Department of Transportation. 

Proposed changes are made available for public review and comment thus allowing industry, academia, regulatory and jurisdictional agencies, and the public-at-large to contribute to NBIC development. It is available in hard copy and through a subscription basis on the Internet.

Resources

National Board BULLETIN 
National Board’s technical journal is distributed worldwide three times annually. In addition to articles of interest to the pressure equipment industry, the BULLETIN provides an up-close look at jurisdiction chief inspectors; timely updates on National Board member changes; helpful tips on equipment inspection, repairs and alterations; industry case histories; and a comprehensive listing of jurisdiction law and regulation amendments. Readers also find technical perspective by National Board staff and guest columnists, a complete listing of offerings from the training department, and the latest violations tracking data.

National Board General Meeting 
Each spring, the General Meeting is conducted in conjunction with the American Society of Mechanical Engineers to address important issues relative to the safe installation, operation, maintenance, construction, repair, and inspection of boilers and pressure vessels. Attendees include boiler and pressure vessel inspectors, mechanical engineers, engineering consultants, equipment manufacturers, representatives of repair organizations, operators, owners and users of boilers and pressure vessels, labor officials, welding professionals, insurance industry representatives, and government safety personnel.

Focus of the week-long event is an exchange of expertise and technical insight shared by other attendees, as well as making contacts and participating in numerous industry and committee meetings. General session presentations cover a wide range of pressure equipment topics such as safe operation, maintenance and repair, safety valves - as well as other unit components – testing codes and standards, risks and reliability, and training.

National Board Scholarship Program 
The National Board annually offers up to two $12,000 scholarships to select college students meeting eligibility standards. Application period extends from September 1 to February 28. Scholarships are available to the children, step-children, grandchildren, or great-grandchildren of past or present National Board Commissioned Inspectors (living or deceased). These are also available to children of past or present National Board employees (living or deceased). To be considered, a student must be enrolled full-time at an accredited U.S. or Canadian college or university, plan to be enrolled for the upcoming academic year, major in pressure equipment-related or closely related engineering discipline, possess a cumulative 3.0 GPA or higher (4.0 scale), and be either a U.S. or Canadian citizen. A letter of recommendation from a current National Board member is also required.

References

External links 
 
 American Society of Mechanical Engineers (ASME)

Safety organizations
Boilers
Pressure vessels